Chatsworth Television is a British television production company, trading between 1973 and 2006. The best-known examples of their programmes are Treasure Hunt (Channel 4, 1982–1989 / BBC Two, 2002–2003), Interceptor (Thames Television for ITV, 1989–1990) and The Crystal Maze (Channel 4, 1990–1995).  The company also collaborated with Central Television in the production of the darts quiz show Bullseye.

External links
Chatsworth Television at ukgameshows.com.

Television production companies of the United Kingdom
Mass media companies established in 1973
Mass media companies disestablished in 2006
1973 establishments in the United Kingdom
2006 disestablishments in the United Kingdom